(Real Name: Akemi Shinoyama (篠山 明美), née, Akemi Uchima (内間 明美); Christian Name: Cynthia) is a Japanese retired J-pop singer-songwriter. She was born in Okinawa on July 2, 1954. In the 1970s, and for a brief 6 years from 19911997, she was active as an idol.

Biography
Minami debuted with the single "17-sai" ("17 Years Old") in the summer of 1971. The song reached the No. 2 position on the Oricon chart list. It was the 11th best selling single of 1971 in Japan and catapulted her into stardom. The song came about after composer Kyōhei Tsutsumi asked Minami what her favourite song was, Minami replied with "Rose Garden" by Lynn Anderson and so Tsutsumi based "17-sai" on that song.

Together with fellow Japanese female entertainers Rumiko Koyanagi and Mari Amachi, Minami laid the foundations of the modern Japanese idol. Minami, Koyanagi and Amachi were dubbed . Before them, Hibari Misora, Chiemi Eri, and Izumi Yukimura were promoted in the same fashion.

Following the success of "17-sai", Minami was nominated for Best Newcomer of the Year at the 13th Japan Record Awards, but lost the title to Rumiko Koyanagi. She was invited to perform "17-sai" on the 22nd edition of Kōhaku Uta Gassen and eventually made 8 appearances on the show.

The two singles that followed "17-sai", "Shiokaze no Melody" (Melody of the Seabreeze) and "Tomodachi" (Friends), both reached the Oricon top 10. In the summer of 1972, "Junketsu" (Chastity) reached the #3 position on the Oricon charts and became one of her most successful singles. Its follow up, "Aishu no Page" (A Page Full of Sorrow), reached the same position and featured an intro spoken in English. In the spring of 1973 "Kizutsuku Sedai" (Wounded Generation) was released, a single with Rock 'N' Roll influences which cracked the top 5. In the summer of that same year "Irozuku Machi" (Painted City) became one of her biggest successes and, according to Minami herself,  "[was] one of my most representative songs". She continued to release popular singles throughout the 1970s (most notably "Hito Kakera No Junjou" (A Little Naive) and "Hito Koishi Kute" (A Wonderful Person).

Minami retired from show business in 1978. She reappeared for a few mini-CD singles and live performances from 19911997, before falling back to retirement.

Personal life 
Minami is married to photographer Kishin Shinoyama, and has a son, Akinobu Shinoyama. She took English classes at Sophia University, and in her performance years, she sang many folk/pop songs in English, and at one point travelled to Los Angeles, California to record her album Cynthia Street. Minami received strict instruction on perfecting her accent, which, during the time, she was speaking intermediately. Along with English, she also speaks Spanish at an intermediate level.

Minami is a Catholic, and used her baptismal name Cynthia throughout her career as an idol.

Partial discography

Singles

Studio albums

EPs

Live albums

Compilations

References

External links 
  (Sony Music Entertainment Japan)
 Minami Saori's Fan Site

Japanese women pop singers
Japanese idols
1954 births
Living people
Musicians from Okinawa Prefecture
Ryukyuan people
20th-century Japanese women singers
20th-century Japanese singers